Roseanne A. Brown (born August 26, 1995) is a Ghanaian American writer of fantasy, science fiction and young adult fiction. She is best known for her debut novel A Song of Wraiths and Ruin, which became a New York Times best seller, and its sequel, A Psalm of Storms and Silence.

Early life 
Roseanne A. Brown was born in Kumasi, Ghana to two Ghanaian parents; her mother is from the Akan tribe. She immigrated when she was three years old along with her family to the United States. As a child, she started writing stories and listened to several West African folktales including that of Anansi narrated by her parents. 
Brown graduated from the University of Maryland with a Bachelor's in Journalism and was also a teaching assistant for the school's Jiménez-Porter Writers’ House program. Brown has written many journalistic work for several outlets including Voice of America.

Career 
Brown's debut novel inspired by her Ghanaian heritage and West African folktales,   A Song of Wraiths and Ruin was published in 2020 by HarperCollins. It was a Kirkus Reviews best book of 2020 and a New York Times best seller. It garnered generally positive receptions. It was followed by a sequel; A Psalm of Storms and Silence which was published in November 2021

In 2021, It was announced that Rick Riordan Presents had acquired the right to publish Serwa Boateng’s Guide to Vampire Hunting, the first book in Brown's second fantasy series based on Akan mythology. It was released on September 6, 2022.

Other Works

In December 2021, Marvel announced that Brown alongside illustrators Dika Araújo, Natacha Bustos and Claudia Aguirre will be writing an original graphic novel based on the Black Panther titled Shuri and T'Challa: Into the Heartlands. It was released on April 19, 2022.

Bibliography 

 A Song of Wraiths and Ruin (2020 Balzer + Bray)
 A Psalm of Storms and Silence (2021, Balzer + Bray)
 Shuri and T'Challa: Into the Heartlands (2022, Marvel)
 Serwa Boateng’s Guide to Vampire Hunting (2022, Rick Riordan Presents)

References 

21st-century American novelists
21st-century Ghanaian women writers
Ghanaian novelists
Ghanaian romantic fiction writers
Ghanaian women novelists
American women novelists
Living people
American people of Ghanaian descent
American writers of young adult literature
American fantasy writers
21st-century American women writers
Writers from Maryland
People from Kumasi
Women science fiction and fantasy writers
Black speculative fiction authors
African-American novelists
21st-century African-American women writers
21st-century African-American writers
Ghanaian women writers
1995 births